The 2010 KNSB Dutch Single Distance Championships were held at the Thialf ice stadium in Heerenveen from Friday October 30 until Sunday November 1, 2009. Although the tournament was held in 2009 it was the 2010 edition as it is part of the 2009/2010 speed skating season.

Schedule

Medalists

Men

Source: SchaatsStatistieken.nl

Women

Source: SchaatsStatistieken.nl

References

External links
 KNSB
 Official Website

Dutch Single Distance Championships
Single Distance Championships
2010 Single Distance
KNSB Dutch Single Distance Championships, 2010